The 1994–95 Texas Tech Red Raiders men's basketball team represented Texas Tech University in the Southwest Conference during the 1994–95 NCAA Division I men's basketball season. The head coach was James Dickey, his 4th year with the team. The Red Raiders played their home games in the Lubbock Municipal Coliseum in Lubbock, Texas.

Texas Tech Red Raiders basketball seasons
Texas Tech
Texas Tech
Texas Tech
Texas Tech